The Garan Dam is an earth-fill embankment dam on the Garan River, a tributary of the Sirvan River, about  northeast of Marivan in Kurdistan Province, Iran. Construction on the dam began in 2002 and it was inaugurated by Iranian President Mahmoud Ahmadinejad on 12 April 2013. It also provides municipal water to the city of Marivan. Officials in Iraq are concerned that the Garan Dam will have a negative impact on the Sirvan River (called the Diyala River in Iraq) as it feeds the Iraqi Darbandikhan Dam and farmlands below it.

See also
Daryan Dam – downstream on the Sirvan

References

Dams in Kurdistan Province
Earth-filled dams
Dams completed in 2013
Marivan County
2013 establishments in Iran
Dams in the Tigris River basin